The 1912 German Ice Hockey Championship was the first season of the German Ice Hockey Championship, the national championship of Germany. Berliner Schlittschuhclub won the championship by defeating SC Charlottenburg in the final.

Final

References

External links
German ice hockey standings 1912-1932
Ger
German Ice Hockey Championship seasons